Goezia is a genus of nematodes belonging to the family Raphidascarididae.

The species of this genus are found in Australia and Northern America.

Species:

Goezia anguillae 
Goezia annulata 
Goezia ascaroides 
Goezia bangladeshi 
Goezia bilqeesae 
Goezia brasiliensis 
Goezia chitali 
Goezia fluviatilis 
Goezia gavialidis 
Goezia gobia 
Goezia intermedia 
Goezia kliksi 
Goezia kollari 
Goezia leporini 
Goezia minuta 
Goezia moraveci 
Goezia nankingensis 
Goezia oncorhynchi 
Goezia pakistanica 
Goezia parva 
Goezia pelagia 
Goezia pseudoascaroides 
Goezia rasheedae 
Goezia sigalasi 
Goezia sinamora 
Goezia spinulosa 
Goezia tricirrata

References

Nematodes